Peronaea is a genus of marine bivalve molluscs, in the subfamily Tellininae of the family Tellinidae.

Species
 † Peronaea basteroti Lesport, Lozouet & Pacaud, 2019 
 Peronaea madagascariensis (Gmelin, 1791)
 Peronaea manumissa (Melvill, 1898)
 Peronaea mars (Hanley, 1846)
 † Peronaea pahiensis (C. A. Fleming, 1950) 
 Peronaea planata (Linnaeus, 1758)
 † Peronaea robini (Finlay, 1924) 
 Peronaea strigosa (Gmelin,1791)
 † Peronaea zonaria (Lamarck, 1806)

References

External links
 OBIS
 Poli J.X. (1791). Testacea utriusque Siciliae eorumque historia et anatome tabulis aeneis illustrata. Ex Regio Typographeio, Parmae. Vol. 1: pp. i-lxxiii
  Spencer H.G., Willan R.C., Marshall B.A. & Murray T.J. (2011). Checklist of the Recent Mollusca Recorded from the New Zealand Exclusive Economic Zone
 Stoliczka F. (1870-1871). The Pelecypoda, with a review of all known genera of this class, fossil and recent. (in) T. Oldham, Paleontologia Indica, being figures and descriptions of the organic remains procured during the progress of the Geological Survey of India. Cretaceous Fauna of Southern India. Volume 3. Memoirs of the Geological Survey of India, Calcutta. pp. i-xxii, 1-537, pl. 1-50

Tellinidae
Bivalve genera